Waialae Country Club is a private country club in East Honolulu, Hawaii.

The Waialae golf course hosts the Sony Open in Hawaii on the PGA Tour in January, the first full-field event of the calendar year. The event has had several corporate sponsors since its founding in 1965 as the Hawaiian Open.

Waialae was featured in the Super Nintendo Entertainment System video game, True Golf Classics: Waialae Country Club, and a Nintendo 64 game Waialae Country Club: True Golf Classics, as well as Tiger Woods PGA Tour 13 from EA Sports and a handful of earlier games in the franchise.

Location
In the 2000 U.S. Census the U.S. Census Bureau defined the K-8 campus as being in the urban Honolulu census-designated place. For the 2010 U.S. Census the bureau created a new census-designated place, East Honolulu.

Origin of Wai'alae
Wai'alae is a Hawaiian word for spring water of the mud hen, which comes from mud hen ('alae) and

wai
In the 1830s and 1840s, the location of the artesian spring for the spring water, or wai, in Wai'alae was a closely guarded secret known only by an elderly couple. King Kamehameha III drank from this spring while visiting. During the twentieth century, the location of the spring became unknown.

'alae
The wetlands in the Hawaiian Islands are a winter habitat for the American coot which is also known as "mud hen". The Hawaiian mud hen, or 'alae, which is referred to in Wai'alae, is the endemic Gallinula sandvicensis and is a close relative of the coot.  Mud hens, moorhens, marsh hens, and swamp hens are closely related.

References

External links
 
 Club History

Buildings and structures in Honolulu
Golf clubs and courses in Hawaii
1927 establishments in Hawaii
Golf clubs and courses designed by Seth Raynor
Sports venues completed in 1927
East Honolulu, Hawaii